In Greek mythology, Antilochus (Ancient Greek: Ἀντίλοχος Antílokhos) 

 Antilochus, son of Pylian king Nestor.
 Antilochus, one of the comrades of the Greek hero Odysseus. When the latter and 12 of his crew came into the port of Sicily, the Cyclops Polyphemus seized and confined them. Along with the Ithacan king and six others namely: Lycaon, Amphialos, Alkimos, Amphidamas and Eurylochos, Antilochus survived the manslaughter of his six companions by the monster.

Notes

References 

 Apollodorus, The Library with an English Translation by Sir James George Frazer, F.B.A., F.R.S. in 2 Volumes, Cambridge, MA, Harvard University Press; London, William Heinemann Ltd. 1921. ISBN 0-674-99135-4. Online version at the Perseus Digital Library. Greek text available from the same website.
 Tzetzes, John, Allegories of the Odyssey translated by Goldwyn, Adam J. and Kokkini, Dimitra. Dumbarton Oaks Medieval Library, Harvard University Press, 2015. 

Characters in Greek mythology